José Fábio Alves Azevedo (born June 15, 1976 in Vera Cruz), or simply Fabão, is a Brazilian centre back currently playing for Sobradinho.

Club statistics

Honors

Club
 FIFA Club World Cup: 2005
 Copa Libertadores: 2005
 Campeonato Brasileiro Série A: 2006
 J. League: 2007

Individual
 Campeonato Brasileiro Série A Team of the Year: 2006

References

External links

1976 births
Living people
Brazilian footballers
Brazilian expatriate footballers
Association football defenders
Paraná Clube players
Esporte Clube Bahia players
CR Flamengo footballers
Real Betis players
Córdoba CF players
Goiás Esporte Clube players
São Paulo FC players
Kashima Antlers players
Santos FC players
Guarani FC players
Henan Songshan Longmen F.C. players
Comercial Futebol Clube (Ribeirão Preto) players
Campeonato Brasileiro Série A players
Segunda División players
J1 League players
Copa Libertadores-winning players
Expatriate footballers in Spain
Expatriate footballers in Japan
Brazilian expatriate sportspeople in Japan
Expatriate footballers in China
Brazilian expatriate sportspeople in China
Brazilian expatriate sportspeople in Spain
Chinese Super League players